Orthetrum serapia, the green skimmer, is a freshwater dragonfly in the family Libellulidae. 
The serapia species is present in Australia, the Philippines, Fiji, Papua New Guinea and Solomon Islands.
It inhabits a wide range of still and sluggish waters, often shallow. In Australia it ranges from the top end of the Northern Territory to about Mackay in central Queensland.

Description
Orthetrum serapia is a medium-sized dragonfly with a wingspan of 60-85mm. Its wings are clear except for a small dark spot at the base of the hindwing. The thorax is greenish to greyish yellow with black markings. The abdomen is black with pale yellow or pale green markings. Orthetrum serapia appears very similar to Orthetrum sabina and can be confused where the range of the two overlaps in north-eastern Australia.

Gallery

See also
 List of Odonata species of Australia

References

External links

Libellulidae
Odonata of Australia
Odonata of Oceania
Insects of Australia
Insects of Fiji
Insects of Papua New Guinea
Insects of the Philippines
Insects of the Solomon Islands
Taxa named by J.A.L. (Tony) Watson
Insects described in 1984